TVB8 was a Mandarin language general entertainment television channel owned and operated by TVB International.

History
On December 7, 1998, TVB Satellite Broadcasting Limited was established. and is the only one to enter overseas Chinese satellite TV market. TVB8 was launched, which is mainly broadcast in Mandarin language. TVB8 and TVB Xinghe Channel belongs to TVB were approved by the State Administration of Radio, Film and Television of the People's Republic of China for the Mainland China viewers.

After 20 years of broadcasting, TVB8 ceased broadcasting on 15 August 2018 in Hong Kong and 1 September 2018 in Asia-Pacific and USA.

See also
 TVB
 TVB Xinghe Channel
 TVB Anywhere

Television stations in Hong Kong
Television channels and stations established in 1998
Mandarin-language television stations
TVB channels